Thereza may refer to:
 an alternative spelling for the feminine given name Teresa
 Thereza Bazar (born 1955), a British-Canadian singer
 Thereza Imanishi-Kari, an Associate Professor of Pathology at Tufts University
 Thereza (genus), a harvestman genus in the sub-family Caelopyginae